James Hare may refer to:

 James Butler Hare (1918–1966), U.S. Congressman from South Carolina
 James M. Hare (1910–1980), Michigan Secretary of State
 Jimmy Hare (1856–1946), photographer for Colliers
 James Hare (boxer) (born 1976), English boxer of the 1990s and 2000s
 James Hare (judge) (1906–1969), Alabama politician and judge
 James Hare (MP) (1747–1804), English politician, diplomat and wit
 James Macadam Hare (1777–1831), Scottish physician